Our Boy (Swedish: Våran pojke) is a 1936 Swedish drama film directed by Arne Bornebusch and starring Edvard Persson, Nils Wahlbom and Tollie Zellman.

The film's art direction was by Bibi Lindström.

Cast
 Edvard Persson as Lars Blomquist  
 Nils Wahlbom as Adolf Holmberg  
 Tollie Zellman as Mrs. Evelina Holmberg  
 Karin Ekelund as Lisa Bergman, maid  
 Olle Granberg as Willie  
 Nils Ekstam as Konrad Wallander  
 Gösta Cederlund as Charlie Swenson  
 Eric Gustafson as Gustav Mattson  
 Carl Browallius as Judge  
 Margit Rosengren as Okänd roll 
 Bertil Alwars as Guest at Blomquist's wedding anniversary  
 Astrid Bodin as Girl in Shop  
 Helga Brofeldt as Gossip 
 Julia Cæsar as Mrs. Karlsson  
 Millan Fjellström as Shop assistant  
 Bengt-Olof Granberg as Court assistant  
 Lars Granberg as Sixten Holmberg  
 Mary Hjelte as Guest at Blomquist's wedding anniversary  
 Axel Isaksson as Janitor at the court  
 Harald Svensson
 Lisa Wirström as Woman at the court
 Greta Zetterström as Greta

References

Bibliography 
 Qvist, Per Olov & von Bagh, Peter. Guide to the Cinema of Sweden and Finland. Greenwood Publishing Group, 2000.

External links 
 

1936 films
1936 drama films
Swedish drama films
1930s Swedish-language films
Swedish black-and-white films
Films directed by Arne Bornebusch
1930s Swedish films